Le burle di Furbicchio ai maghi (Furbicchio pranks to the magicians) is a comic strip story designed by Filiberto Scarpelli and published in Italy by the Imperia Publishing House in 1924 as the fourth volume of the Raccolta Gaia collection; it's considered the first comic book published in Italy.

References 

italian comics